Datin Paduka Dato' Aini Ideris is a Malaysian academic and veterinarian. She served as the 8th Vice-Chancellor of UPM from 1 January 2016 until 31 August 2020. Her research interests include  disease control and productions of vaccines for poultry.

Awards
In 2011, Professor Dr. Aini received the National Academic Award (AAN) 2010 for the Innovation and Product Commercialisation Award Category, for the innovation and commercialisation of the Newcastle disease (ND V4-UPM) vaccines.

Honour

Honour of Malaysia 
  :
  Knight Grand Companion of the Order of Sultan Sharafuddin Idris Shah (SSIS) – Datin Paduka Setia (11 December 2019)

References

External links
 Professor Aini Ideris - Vice Chancellor

Vice-chancellors of universities in Malaysia
University of Putra Malaysia alumni
1953 births
Living people
Malaysian biologists
Malaysian veterinarians
Women biologists
Women veterinarians
Women academic administrators